Delta Columbae  is a binary star system in the constellation Columba. It can be seen with the naked eye having an apparent visual magnitude of 3.85. The distance to this system, based upon an annual parallax shift of 13.94 mas, is around 234 lightyears.

Delta Columbae was a latter designation of 3 Canis Majoris, as the early astronomers Johann Bayer and John Flamsteed did not include the constellation Columba in their star charts. It has the uncommon traditional name Ghusn al Zaitun, from the Arabic الغصن الزيتون al-ghuşn al-zaitūn "the olive branch" (carried by the dove of Noah's Ark). 

This is a single-lined spectroscopic binary system with an orbital period of 868.78 days and an eccentricity of 0.7. The primary component is a G-type bright giant star with a stellar classification of G7 II. It radiates around 149 time the solar luminosity from its outer atmosphere at an effective temperature of 5,136 K.

References

G-type bright giants
Runaway stars
Spectroscopic binaries
Columba (constellation)
Columbae, Delta
Canis Majoris, 03
Durchmusterung objects
044762
030277
02296